Miyakea raddeella is a moth in the family Crambidae. It was described by Aristide Caradja in 1910. It is found in China (Beijing, Guangxi, Guizhou, Hebei, Heilongjiang, Henan, Hubei, Shaanxi, Tianjin, Tibet, Zhejiang), Korea and Russia.

The wingspan is 17–25 mm.

References

Crambini
Moths described in 1910
Moths of Asia